9 seats, 23 were up for election.

Following the election, Edinburgh Corporation was composed of 31 Progressives, 21 Labour councillors, 7 SNP councillors, 6 Conservatives, 2 Liberals, and 2 independents. The SNP saw its vote collapse, failing to win a single ward and losing the only ward it was defending.

Following the election, the Progressives and Conservative coalition retained controlled of the council with a majority of five seats.

A total of 135,188 residents voted.

Aggregate results

Ward Results

References

1970
1970 Scottish local elections